is a Japanese holding company which owns several restaurant chains in Japan. The largest is Sukiya serving gyūdon, rice bowls with beef.

Restaurant chains 

The brands owned or licensed by Zensho include:

Gyūdon:
 Sukiya
 Nakau

Family restaurants:
 Coco's
 Big Boy
 El Torito
 Jolly Pasta
 Fracasso
 Hanaya Yohei

Fast food:
 Kyubeiya
 Denmaru
 Hamazushi
 Lotteria

Yakiniku:
 Gyuan
 Ichiban
 Takarajima

Other:
 Chicago Pizza, Chicago Delita, SushiTake

Formerly owned chains
 Wendy's Japan (all outlets closed December 2009)

References

External links 
 Zensho Holdings website 
 Sukiya website 
 Nakau website 
 Hamasushi website 
 Hanayayohei website 
 The Chicken RiceShop website 

Restaurants in Tokyo
Food and drink companies based in Tokyo
Holding companies based in Tokyo
Companies listed on the Tokyo Stock Exchange
Japanese companies established in 1982
Holding companies established in 1982
Food and drink companies established in 1982